Pacemaker International is a registered non-governmental organization (NGO) that works to improve education in Kenya, majoring with the junior levels.

History 
Plans to start Pacemaker International were laid between March and September 2012. Peggy Ocholla founded the organization between September–December 2012 and early 2013. It was officially registered that year.

Promoting Access to Community Education (PACE) is a program created by the new organization. The PACE team began recruiting volunteers through regular visits to Loreto Limuru, Loreto Kiambu, Buruburu Girls, Aquinas High School, Starehe Boys Centre, Lenana High School and Pangani Girls High School. 63 applications were initially received. The same month, PACE trained its first bunch of 24 volunteers, assisted by TAC Tutors from Teacher Advisory Centres in Nairobi.

This pioneer class was sent to four Nairobi schools: North Highridge Primary(PARKLANDS), Edelvale(KAYOLE), Farasi Lane(LOWER KABETE) and Moonlight Primary(KIBERA). By April, the pioneering class had donated 1,721 hours in volunteer service. PACE won the Most Promising Project award-Dell Social Innovation Challenge in April 2013. The second group of volunteers were trained in May. By August, the cumulative number of volunteer service hours increased to 2,929 hours.

Led by Carol Theuri, PACE held an Amazyng Race Fundraiser in support of Youth Volunteer work. PACE also partnered with Nation Media Group in the Nation Media Groups' Newspapers in Education program. During the August 2013 Graduation Ceremony, PACE graduated its first class of Fellows into Alumni. 

PACE was featured in the Clinton Global Initiative-New York as a leading example of young people making a difference, in September 2013, and also in October when PACE was featured on the International Day of the Girl Child publication. By December 2013, volunteer hours reached 5235.

Between January and July 2014, a class of 110 volunteers contributed 13,880 hours. PACE won the Harvard Graduate School of Education Bridge Pitch competition and was featured as finalists in the annual Transform Kenya Awards.

In 2016, 127 volunteers donated 100,000 hours of volunteer service.

Principles

Vision 
"We envision a Kenya where access to a high quality education is the norm for all children and where young people are empowered, and then engaged to lead change in their local communities."

Mission 
"To create equitable learning opportunities for students in rural and slum areas of Kenya."

Program 
PACE recruits gap year students after they complete the Kenya Certificate of Secondary Education(KCSE). PACE trains them to become Teaching Assistants in underprivileged primary schools. The youth engage in development projects during their service.

Teaching Assistants start development projects and assist teachers with activities such as marking books, supervising exams and extracurricular activities. They submit signed time cards each week. They complete weekly reports online to give feedback and to allow their progress to tracked.

The application process is competitive. Successful applicants are selected on the basis of academic performance, demonstrated leadership qualities and the desire to improve the quality of education in underprivileged communities. They undergo an intensive one-week training program before becoming Teaching Assistants. After the training, they are posted to respective schools close to their places of residence and receive a regular stipend. They are expected to offer service for at least 15 hours per week.

Community engagement is limited to Primary education, apart from Longewan Baptist Secondary School Baringo 

The youth join a Fellowship, and are called Fellows. They undergo training every fortnight to strengthen their leadership skills.

Partners

Schools 
 Drive Inn Primary School
 Bohra Primary School
 North Highridge Primary School
 Kawangware Primary School
 Jogoo road primary
 Edel Vale Primary School
 Dagoretti girls Rehabilitation school
 Wangu primary
 Tom Mboya Primary
 Madaraka Primary
 Farasi Lane Primary
 Oloosurutia Primary
 Pangani primary
 Jogoo road primary
 Kiwanja Primary
 Njathaini Primary
 Kamuiru primary
 ACK Karura primary
 Mathari primary
 General Kago Primary
 Athi river prison primary
 Komarock Primary
 Uhuru gardens primary
 Joseph Kang'ethe primary

Supporters 
 Global Education Fund
 Nation Media Group—Provides reading materials for Reading Clubs
 Akili Dada—connects women leaders to PACE
 25 Public Primary schools

Recognition 
 Clinton Global Initiative University-Education Commitment of the Year, 2012
 Dell Social Innovation Challenge-Most Promising Project, 2013
 Harvard Graduate School of Education-Bridge Pitch winner, 2014
 Transform Kenya Awards-Finalist, 2014

Alumni board 
The launch of PACE Alumni Board during the August 2016 graduation seeks to:
 Increase the ability and interest of high school graduates to serve as teaching assistants
 Increase awareness among youth on the benefits of volunteering
 Promote a culture of community engagement and continuous learning among the youth
 Create an informed, passionate alumni network empowered to expand educational opportunities for at risk students. 
 Afser Africa project targeting Social Development Goals(SDGs)
 Increase the number of volunteers and fiscal capacity of the organisation through its #ChangeForChange campaign.

References

Education in Kenya